Shabaki is an Indo-Iranian language and belongs to the subgroup Zaza-Gorani of the Northwestern Iranian languages. The Shabaki language is spoken by the Shabak people in the Mosul region of northern Iraq. It has similarities with the Northwestern Iranian language Gorani (or Hawrami), which is often referred as a "Kurdish dialect", although the Kurdish languages form an independent group within the Northwestern Iranian languages. Shabaki is a distinct language. It also has elements of Arabic, Turkish and Persian language. The number of speakers of Shabaki was estimated in 1989 to be between 10,000 and 20,000. Currently, the number of native speakers of Shabaki is estimated at 250,000.
As Shabaki is one of the Zaza–Gorani languages, it is most similar to languages like Gorani (Hewrami), Bajelani, Sarli and Zazaki. Because Zaza–Gorani belongs to the Northwestern Iranian branch.

Shabaki is a language in its own right and not a spoken dialect of any other language, with its own vocabulary and pronunciations, despite the fact that words from many other languages have entered into it as a result of the geographical nearness to other ethnic tribes.

Status
The Shabak people fear the demise of the Shabaki language especially after the occupation of the ISIS terrorist groups to their home in Nineveh Plain, which led to the displacement of the majority of their population and the other groups residing in that area.

Comparison

Pronouns

Vocabulary

Literature
 Dr. Sultan, Abbas Hassan Jassim (University of Kufa, Iraq)
Shabaki - English Dictionary or here as PDF (2016)
An Account of Light verb constructions in Shabaki (Vol. 5 2011, 2)
An Account of Clitics in Shabaki with Reference to Wackernagel's Law (2014)
Serial verb constructions in Shabaki
Reciprocal Pronouns in Shabaki (Vol. 4 2010, 1)
Causatives in Shabaki (Vol. 4 2010, 2)
An Account of Epistemic Modality in Shabaki
The truth conditional content of evidentials in Shabaki
Evidentials in Shabaki
Shabaki alphabets or here as Slideshow
 E. K. Brown, R. E. Asher, J. M. Y. Simpson (Elsevier, 2006)
Encyclopedia of language & linguistics, Band 2

References

External links
 Ethnologue
 SIL International
 MultiTree

Northwestern Iranian languages
Languages of Iraq
Languages of Kurdistan
Shabak people